Paloor Kotta Falls is a waterfall in Kadungapuram village of Malappuram district in Kerala, India. It is situated 7 kilometres away from Angadipuram and 10 kilometres away from Perinthalmanna town. It originates from a pond-like water source and empties into a small canal. Tipu Sultan had once sought asylum here.

References

External links 

Waterfalls of Kerala
Tourism in Kerala
Malappuram district